Friedrich Peter Johannes Joussen (born 19 April 1963) is a German businessman, and the executive chairman (Vorstandsvorsitzender) of TUI Group (Touristik Union International).

Early life
He was born in Duisburg in North Rhine-Westphalia. He attended the Landfermann-Gymnasium. At university, he studied electrical engineering.

Career
After graduating from university, he became a software developer in the USA. He spent 22 years in the telecommunications industry.

Vodafone
He rose through Vodafone, and its predecessors, to become Chief Executive of Vodafone Germany from 2003 to 2012. Vodafone Germany has around 36 million customers and around 12,000 staff. At Vodafone Germany, he was replaced by Jens Schulte-Bockum, who was the former Chief Executive of Vodafone Netherlands. Vodafone Germany has the Vodafone D2 brand.

TUI

He became Executive Chairman of TUI AG in 2013.

In June 2022, it was announced that Joussen would be stepping down from his position at TUI in the September of 2022, and would be replaced by Sebastian Ebel the company’s currnet CFO.

Personal life
He is married with four children.

See also
 :Category:Travel and holiday companies of Germany

References

External links
 TUI Group – Friedrich Joussen

1963 births
Businesspeople in the hospitality industry
German chief executives
German electrical engineers
German telecommunications industry businesspeople
Members of the Order of Merit of North Rhine-Westphalia
People from Duisburg
TUI Group
Vodafone people
Living people
Engineers from North Rhine-Westphalia